Coleman River is a  stream that is located in the Blue Ridge Mountains, mostly within Rabun County, Georgia. It is one of the main tributaries of the Tallulah River. The headwaters of Coleman River are located in Clay County, North Carolina, and the river travels a short distance before crossing into Georgia. The northern part of Coleman River in Georgia, from an elevation of about  northward, together with the portion of Coleman River in North Carolina, is located in the Southern Nantahala Wilderness.

Coleman River is a designated trout stream, and a portion of it is further designated by the Wildlife Resources Division of the Georgia Department of Natural Resources as being artificial fishing lures only. Species of trout found in Coleman River include the native brook trout, together with rainbow trout and brown trout (which are not native and have been introduced to the river).

In connection with its Final Environmental Impact Statement in 2004 for the Chattahoochee National Forest, the Forest Service concluded that Coleman River was eligible for inclusion in the National Wild and Scenic River program as a result of its scenic beauty and recommended further study.  Approximately one mile of the scenic lower part of the river is easily accessible by a hiking trail that starts in the Coleman River Scenic Area.

Coleman River is the namesake of a rock formation that is part of the Coweta Group.  The Coleman River Formation consists of metamorphic rocks, predominantly gneiss and schist.  The formation is named for exposures that occur along Coleman River in Rabun County.

Until 1997, Coleman River was at the heart of a wildlife management area known as the Coleman River Wildlife Management Area.  However, in 1997, the area was dropped from the wildlife management program due to budget cuts.

References

External links
Coleman River Information
TopoQuest Map of the Coleman River in Georgia

Rivers of Rabun County, Georgia
Rivers of Georgia (U.S. state)
Rivers of Clay County, North Carolina
Rivers of North Carolina